Bangkok Fashion City was a campaign under the Ministry of Industry of Thailand. This 1.8-billion-baht program's purpose was to establish Bangkok as a regional fashion hub and eventually as a world fashion leader on the level of New York, Paris, and Milan. The project was initiated by the Thaksin administration in 2003. It was scrapped in 2006.

References

External links
 http://www.listen77.com/mp3.php?mp3=73b3272f-8473-4386-8fc2-a5733c91e99c&nom=Hooligans-Félember.mp3

Culture of Bangkok
Economy of Thailand
Fashion organizations
Government programmes of Thailand